The Directorate of Intelligence and Security (DIS)  is the internal intelligence agency of Botswana founded under the Intelligence and Security Service Act which commenced in 2008. The DIS was formed to oversees matter of the counterintelligence and internal security of Botswana. The DIS has investigative jurisdiction to arrest or detain and interrogate over a wide range of criminal offenses.

Organization 
The Director General for the Agency is Brigadier Peter Magosi who was previously on the Special Forces for the Botswana Defence Force before being appointed to the agency in 2016.
Edward Robert is the Public relations officer of the DIS

See also 

 Botswana Communications Regulatory Authority
 Civil Aviation Authority of Botswana
 Statistics Botswana

References 

Government agencies of Botswana
Government agencies established in 2007
Intelligence analysis agencies